Carex biegensis is a tussock-forming species of perennial sedge in the family Cyperaceae. It is native to central parts of Africa, including Rwanda, Tanzania, Uganda and the Democratic Republic of the Congo.

See also
List of Carex species

References

biegensis
Taxa named by Henri Chermezon
Plants described in 1935
Flora of Rwanda
Flora of Uganda
Flora of Tanzania
Flora of the Democratic Republic of the Congo